Jamie Paul Allen (born 29 January 1995) is an English professional footballer who plays as a midfielder for  club Coventry City.

Career

Rochdale
Born in Rochdale, Greater Manchester, Allen joined Rochdale's youth system in 2003, aged eight. After being instrumental in the Academy (being also shortlisted for League Two Apprentice of The Year), he signed a professional deal in 2013 summer.

Allen made his professional debut on 8 October, starting in a 1–0 win against Port Vale. He has been compared to Manchester United and England midfielder Paul Scholes. He made his league debut four days later, starting in a 3–0 home win over Newport County, hitting the bar in the lead-up to the second goal.

Allen scored his first professional goal on 2 November, but in a 1–2 home loss against AFC Wimbledon. On 27 June 2014, he signed a new two-year contract with Rochdale. On 7 August 2015, Allen was named captain of Rochdale.

Burton Albion
On 31 August 2017, Allen joined Championship club Burton Albion. He scored his first goal for Burton in a 2–1 win over Barnsley on 20 February 2018.

Coventry City
Allen signed a three-year contract with League One club Coventry City on 28 June 2019 for an undisclosed fee.

After injuries hampered the start of his time with The Sky Blues, Allen finally made his first League appearance for the club off the bench in a 1–1 draw with Sunderland.

Allen would go on to make a further 10 appearances before the season was curtailed due to the COVID-19 Pandemic. Coventry were crowned Champions of League One and Allen picked up a winners medal.

In 2020-21, Allen was used mainly as a squad player as Coventry competed in The Championship for the first time in 8 years. His only goal of the season come in a 2–0 win against Sheffield Wednesday.

Allen became a key player in the Sky Blues squad in the 2021-22 and impressed with his energetic box to box midfield performances. His fine form throughout the campaign earned him a new contract until July 2024 His only goal of the 2021-22 season came in a 2-1 win against Reading at The Coventry Building Society Arena.

Career statistics

References

External links

1995 births
Living people
Footballers from Rochdale
English footballers
Association football midfielders
Rochdale A.F.C. players
Burton Albion F.C. players
Coventry City F.C. players
English Football League players